Love Story (Italian: Una storia d'amore) is a 1942 Italian drama film directed by Mario Camerini and starring Assia Noris, Piero Lulli and Carlo Campanini. It is based on the play Life Begins by Mary McDougal Axelson, previously adapted into a 1932 film of the same title and a 1939 film A Child Is Born. Along with A Pistol Shot it marked an attempt to showcase Noris as a dramatic actress, rather than the White Telephone comedies she had become known for. It was screened at the 1942 Venice Film Festival.

It was produced by Lux Film, one of the leading film companies of Fascist Italy. It was shot at the Cinecittà Studios in Rome. The film's sets were designed by the art directors Gastone Medin and Gino Brosio. The future star Marcello Mastroianni appeared briefly as an uncredited extra.

Plot
A young woman with a troubled past marries a worker from a mechanical engineering factory and tries to live a respectable life. However a man who knows her background attempts to blackmail her and loses her head and kills him. She is sentenced to ten years in prison, and gives birth to a child while in jail.

Cast

 Assia Noris as Anna Roberti
 Piero Lulli as Gianni Castelli
 Carlo Campanini as Agostino
 Guido Notari as Ferreri
 Osvaldo Genazzani  as 	Sandro
 Emilio Cigoli as L'avvocato difensore
 Emma Baron as L'infermiera della clinica 
 Antonio Battistella as 	Enrico Banducci
 Giorgio Capecchi as L'aiuto chirurgo
 Dhia Cristiani as Clara
 Olinto Cristina as Il presidente del tribunale 
 Gualtiero De Angelis as 	Il poliziotto di notte
 Luigi Giovarella as 	Il professor Venturi 
 Augusto Marcacci as 	L'avvocato dell'accusa
 Marcello Mastroianni as Extra
 Carlo Micheluzzi as 	Bibi - il padre ansioso
 Egisto Olivieri as Il primo agente della questura
 Amina Pirani Maggi as 	La padrona della Pensione Gallini
 Vanna Polverosi as 	La madre dei due gemelli 
 Luisa Ventura as La padrona della pasticceria
 Ciro Berardi as l'usciere dell'officina SIMA

References

Bibliography
 Aprà, Adriano. The Fabulous Thirties: Italian cinema 1929-1944. Electa International, 1979.
 Dewey, Donald. Marcello Mastroianni: His Life and Art. Carol Publishing Group, 1993.

External links

1942 films
1940s Italian-language films
1942 drama films
Italian black-and-white films
Films directed by Mario Camerini
Italian drama films
Lux Film films
Films shot at Cinecittà Studios
Italian films based on plays
Remakes of American films
1940s Italian films